Kitada (written: 北田) is a Japanese surname. Notable people with the surname include:

 Akihiro Kitada (born 1971), Japanese sociologist
 Akiko Kitada (born 1982), Japanese former field hockey player
 Kayo Kitada (born 1978), retired Japanese judoka
 Rui Kitada (born 1981), Japanese professional golfer
 Sumiko Kitada (born 1962), Japanese badminton player

Japanese-language surnames